The Harlem Globetrotters is a 1951 Sport/Drama film about the famous African American basketball team The Harlem Globetrotters released by Columbia Pictures. The film stars Thomas Gomez, Bill Walker, Dorothy Dandridge, Angela Clarke, and Peter M. Thompson.

Broadcast
The film premiered on television on Turner Classic Movies (TCM) on May 29, 2012.

Plot

Cast

Thomas Gomez as Coach Abe Saperstein
Bill Walker as Prof. Turner
Dorothy Dandridge as Ann Carpenter
Angela Clarke as Sylvia Saperstein
Peter M. Thompson as  Martin 
Billy Brown as Billy Townsend (Globetrotter)
Roscoe Cumberland as Roscoe  (Globetrotter)
William 'Pop' Gates as 'Pop' Gates (Globetrotter)
Marques Haynes	as Marques (Globetrotter)
Louis 'Babe' Pressley as 'Babe' Pressley (Globetrotter)
Ermer Robinson as Elmer Robinson (Globetrotter)
Ted Strong as Ted Strong (Globetrotter)
Reece 'Goose' Tatum as 'Goose' Tatum (Globetrotter)
Frank Washington as Frank Washington (Globetrotter)
Clarence Wilson as Clarence Wilson  (Globetrotter)

External links

A link to the feature on TCM's website

1951 films
American basketball films
Cultural depictions of the Harlem Globetrotters
Columbia Pictures films
1950s biographical drama films
1950s sports drama films
American sports drama films
African-American biographical dramas
Biographical films about sportspeople
1951 drama films
American black-and-white films
1950s English-language films
1950s American films